Yeo Seung-Won (born May 1, 1984) is a South Korean football player (formerly Gwangju Sangmu, Incheon United, Korea National League side Busan Transportation Corporation FC, Suwon Samsung Bluewings and Daejeon Korea Hydro & Nuclear Power FC).

References

1984 births
Living people
South Korean footballers
Incheon United FC players
Gimcheon Sangmu FC players
Suwon Samsung Bluewings players
K League 1 players
Korea National League players
Association football forwards